Laura Staines (born November 25, 1953) is an American rower. She competed in the women's coxless pair event at the 1976 Summer Olympics.

References

External links
 

1953 births
Living people
American female rowers
Olympic rowers of the United States
Rowers at the 1976 Summer Olympics
Sportspeople from Brooklyn
21st-century American women